John Tasman Richardson (6 December 1906 – 28 September 1993) was an Australian rules footballer who played with South Melbourne and Melbourne in the Victorian Football League (VFL).

Notes

External links 

1906 births
Australian rules footballers from Victoria (Australia)
Sydney Swans players
Melbourne Football Club players
1993 deaths